Monsta Island Czars was a New York City/Long Island hip-hop collective that was formed by MF Grimm and included MF DOOM among numerous other NYC MC's. Due to inactivity and DOOM's death in 2020, the group ceased activity.

History
The members of the group take their names from movie monsters from Toho's Godzilla movies. Escape from Monsta Island!, their only full-length album, was released in 2003 by Metal Face Records. Most M.I.C. (Monsta Island Czars) tracks are produced by King Caesar (aka X-Ray) or King Geedorah (aka MF DOOM).

There was a rumor that in 2007, remaining members of M.I.C. were set to release a new album titled Return To Monsta Island - however, this was dispelled in an interview with X-Ray. Fans soon became unsure whether the group was on hiatus or had broken up. Clues included the collective's MySpace webpage being deleted and their official site (monstaisland.com) going dark.  In 2007 rumors continued that M.I.C. was still active and working on new tracks, but nothing seemed to come out of it.

In 2013 and 2016, X-Ray released two new albums titled All Hail The King and All The King's Men, respectively, featuring multiple members of M.I.C. including Spiga, Kong, Kamackeris, Megalon, and Rodan. Although these aren't official Monsta Island Czars projects, they are confirmation much of the group is still together and making music.

Discography

 Escape from Monsta Island!  (2003)

References

External links
Monsta Island Czars forum (Down)
Review of Escape from Monsta Island
Interview with newest member Baragon
A Complete Guide To: Monsta Island Czars -- annotated discography of main members and side projects

American hip hop groups
Hip hop collectives